Roderick Gregory Coleman Williams OBE (born 1965) is a British baritone and composer.

Biography
Williams was born in North London to a Welsh father and a Jamaican mother. He attended Christ Church Cathedral School in Oxford and Haberdashers' Aske's Boys' School, a public school in Hertfordshire. He was a choral scholar at Magdalen College, Oxford, and then became a music teacher. At the age of 28, he resumed music studies at the Guildhall School of Music in London.  At Guildhall, he made his operatic debut as Tarquinius in Benjamin Britten's The Rape of Lucretia.

Williams first appeared at The Proms in 1996 as the Royal Herald in Verdi's Don Carlos.  He was a soloist at the 2013 Proms production of Ralph Vaughan Williams' ‘A Sea Symphony’, and again in 2014 Last Night of the Proms, which included performances of his own arrangements of two songs. His commercial recordings include albums for Naxos and for Signum. In 2006, Williams and the Sacconi Quartet made the premiere recording of Gerald Finzi's 1921-22 song cycle By Footpath and Stile.

Williams is the president of Junior Saint James Singers and has been the president of Malvern Concert Club since July 2014 and of the Three Choirs Festival Society since December 2016. He was appointed an Officer of the Order of the British Empire (OBE) in the 2017 Birthday Honours for services to music. In 2019 he was announced as Patron of Birmingham Bach Choir. In 2020 he was appointed President of the London concert series Thames Concerts. In 2022, he was appointed a Vice-President of The Bach Choir.

Williams and his wife, Miranda, have two daughters and a son. His sister-in-law is the stage director Orpha Phelan.

In 2022, Williams became a Patron of Opera Brava, "Britain's leading outdoor touring Opera Company." In 2023, he was announced as one of the composers who would each create a brand new piece for the Coronation of Charles III and Camilla.

Operatic repertoire
 
 
Escamillo in Carmen by Bizet
Sid in Albert Herring by Britten
Billy Budd in Billy Budd by Britten
Henry Cuffe in Gloriana by Britten
Ned Keene and Balstrode in Peter Grimes by Britten
Tarquinius in The Rape of Lucretia by Britten
Top in The Tender Land by Copland
Belcore in L'elisir d'amore by Donizetti
Albert in Werther by Massenet
Don Giovanni in Don Giovanni by Mozart

Guglielmo in Così fan tutte by Mozart
The Count in Le nozze di Figaro by Mozart
Papageno in Die Zauberflöte by Mozart 
Prince Andrei Bolkonsky in War and Peace by Prokofiev
Marcello in La bohème by Puccini
Schaunard in La bohème by Puccini
Figaro in Il barbiere di Siviglia by Rossini
Harlequin in Ariadne auf Naxos by Strauss
Onegin in Eugene Onegin by Tchaikovsky
The King's Herald in Don Carlos by Verdi

Recordings

Song with piano or chamber accompaniment

Complete Cantatas  Rameau  With Rachel Elliott, soprano, James Gilchrist, tenor, and Thomas Guthrie, bass.  New Chamber Opera Ensemble Cond. Gary Cooper  1998  ASV Ltd  CD GAX 234/1 and /2

The Songs of Percy Turnbull   Turnbull   With Nancy Argenta, soprano and Robin Bowman, piano.  2000  Somme  SOMMCD 020

Blood-red Carnations   Songs by Schoenberg  With Sarah Connolly, mezzo-soprano, Iain Burnside, piano.  2002  Black Box

I said to Love - Let Us Garlands Bring - Before and After Summer   Finzi  With Iain Burnside, piano 2004  Naxos  8.557644

Songs of Travel - The House of Life - Four poems by Fredegond Shove    Vaughan Williams  With Iain Burnside, piano.  2004  Naxos  8.557643

Beastly Tales  Panufnik  With Patrizia Rozario, sopranon, Yvonne Howard, mezzo-soprano, City of London Sinfonia cond. Sian Edwards  2005  EMI Classics  0946 3 56692 2 0

Earth and Air and Rain - By Footpath and Stile - To a Poet    Finzi  With Iain Burnside, piano and the Sacconi Quartet.  2005/6  Naxos  8.557963

Severn & Somme    Howells, Sanders, Wilson, Venables  With Susie Allan, piano.  2006  Somm   SOMMCD 057

The Sky Shall Be Our Roof  Songs from the operas of Vaughan Williams  With Sarah Fox, soprano, Juliette Pochin, mezzo-soprano, Andrew Staples, Iain Burnside, piano.  2007  Albion Records  ALB001

Complete Solo Songs    Moeran   With Geraldine McGreevy, soprano, Adrian Thompson, Tenor, John Talbot, piano.   2008/9  Chandos CHAN 10596(2)

Songs before Sleep  Richard Rodney Bennett  With Sophie Daneman, soprano, Susan Bickley, Mezzo-soprano, Benjamin Hulett, tenor, Oliver Coates, cello and Iain Burnside, piano.  2009  NMC Recordings  NMC D155

Songs  Michael Head  With Ailish Tynan, soprano, Catherine Wyn-Rogers, mezzo-soprano, Christopher Glynn, piano.  2009  Hyperion  CDA67899

Songs from A Shropshire Lad - Folk Songs from Sussex    Butterworth  With Iain Burnside, piano. 2010   Naxos  8.572426

Songs and Proverbs of Williams Blake - Tit for Tat - Folk-songs    Britten  With Iain Burnside, piano.  2011  Naxos  8.572600

Songs - The Airmen  Shaw   With Sophie Bevan, soprano, Andrew Kennedy, tenor, Iain Burnside, piano.  2012   Delphian  DCD 33105

Italienisches Liederbuch  Wolf   With Joan Rodgers, soprano, Roger Vignoles, piano.  2012  Champs Hill Records  CHRCD054

The Isles of Greece (from the CD 'Wild Cyclamen')   Hugh Wood   With Iain Burnside, piano.  2014  NMC Recordings

Dylan  -  The Drowning of Capel Celyn   Stimpson   With Sioned Williams, harp.    2006/2015   Stone Records

Twelve Sets of English Lyrics - Volume 1     Parry  With Susan Gritton, soprano, James Gilchrist, tenor, Andrew West, piano. 2015  Somm  SOMMCD 257

The Songs of Donald Swann  With Dame Felicity Lott, soprano, Kathryn Rudge, mezzo-soprano, John Mark Ainsley, tenor, Christopher Glynn, piano.  2015/2016  Hyperion  CDA68172

Twelve Sets of English Lyrics - Volume 2     Parry  With Sarah Fox, soprano, James Gilchrist, tenor, Andrew West, piano.  2017  Somm  SOMMCD 270

Twelve Sets of English Lyrics - Volume 3     Parry  With Sarah Fox, soprano, Andrew West, piano. 2017  Somm  SOMMCD 272

Man and Bat  Skempton  Ensemble 360  2017  First Hand Records  FHR90

Winter Journey   Schubert's Winterreise in an English version by Jeremy Sams   With Christopher Glynn, piano.  2017  Signum  SIGCD531

Those Blue Remembered Hills    Songs by Gurney, Howells   With the Bridge Quartet, Michael Dussek, piano   2018  EM Records

Die Schöne Müllerin  Schubert  With Iain Burbside, piano.  2018  Chandos  CHAN 20113  

The Song of Love  songs by Vaughan Williams   With Kitty Whately, mezzo-soprano, Williams Vann, piano  2018   Albion    ALBCD037

Time and Space  songs by Holst and Vaughan Williams   With Mary Bevan, soprano, Williams Vann, Jack Liebeck, violin.   2018  Albion   ALBCD038

Schwanengesang/ An die ferne Geliebte  Schubert/Beethoven  With Iain Burnside, piano.  2019  Chandos  CHAN 20126  

Maud -  A Shropshire Lad    Somervell  With Susie Allan, piano.  2019  Somm  SOMMCD 0615

Schwanengesang    Schubert  An die ferne Geliebte  Beethoven  With Iain Burnside, piano.  2020  Chandos  20126

Birdsong   Songs by Brahms, Clara Schumann, Robert Schumann, Beamish   With Andrew West, piano.   2020  Somm  SOMMCD 0633

Folk Songs Volume 1   Vaughan Williams  With Mary Bevan, soprano, Nicky Spence, tenor, Jack Liebeck, violin, William Vann, piano.  2020  Albion Records  ALBCD042

Folk Songs Volume 2   Vaughan Williams   With Mary Bevan, soprano, Nicky Spence, tenor, Thomas Gould, violin, Williams Vann, piano.  2020  Albion Records  ALBCD043

Folk Songs Volume 3  Vaughan Williams   With Mary Bevan, soprano, Nicky Spence. tenor, Williams Vann, piano  2020  Albion Records  ALBCD044

Folk Songs Volume 4  Vaughan Williams   With Mary Bevan, soprano, Nicky Spence, tenor, William Vann, piano  2020  Albion Records  ALBCD045

Winterreise    Schubert  With Iain Burnside, piano.   2021  Chandos CHAN 20163

Mirages: The Art of French Song     With Roger Vignoles, piano.   2021   Champs Hill Records  CHRCD159

Façade  Walton   With Tamsin Dalley, The Orchestra of The Swan  cond. Bruce O'Neil  2021 Somm   SOMMCD 277

On This Shining Night  Warlock, Barber, Beamish, Delius  With Sophie Bevan, soprano, James Gilchrist, tenor, the Coull Quartet  2021  Somm    SOMMCD 0654

Songs of William Busch    Busch and others  With Diana Moore, mezzo-sorano, Robin Tritschler, tenor, John Reid, piano.  2021  Lyrita  SRCD.409

Oratorio, cantata and other orchestral and choral works

Shield of Faith   Bliss    Finzi Singers dir. Paul Spicer  1991  Chandos  CHAN 8980

In terra pax  Frank Martin  London Philharmonic, Brighton Festival Chorus cond Matthias Bamert  1995  Chandos CHAN 9465

The Hag/Two songs of Robert Bridges  Frank Bridge  BBC National Orchestra of Wales  cond. Richard Hickox  2003  Chandos CHAN 10246

Mass of the Children  Rutter   The Cambridge Singers, Cantate Youth Choir, City of London Sinfonia  cond. John Rutter  2003  Collegium Records  COLCD 129

The Crucifixion  Stainer  Guildford Philharmonic Orchestra, Guildford Camerata  cond. Barry Rose  2003  Lammas Records LAMM 154D

Christopher Columbus - A Musical Journey  Walton  BBC National Orchestra and Chorus of Wales  cond. Richard Hickox  2004  Chandos  CHSA 5034

The Apostles  Elgar  Canterbury Choral Society, Philharmonia Orchestra  cond. Richard Cooke  2005  Quartz  QTZ 2017

Fantasia on Christmas Carols/The First Nowell/On Christmas Night  Vaugan Williams  City of London Sinfonia cond Richard Hickox  2005  Chandos  CHAN 10385

Symphony No.1 - 'Oliver Cromwell  Rutland Boughton  BBC Concert Orchestra cond. Handley  2006   Dutton  CDLX 7185

Sir Patrick Spens  Howells  Katy Butler, soprano, James Gilchrist, tenor, Bournemouth Symphony Orchestra  cond. David Hill  2006  Naxos  8.570352

Five Poems of the Spirit  Bairstow  With The Choir of St John's College, Cambridge, Britten Sinfonia  cond. David Hill  2007  Hyperion  CDA67497

Omar Khayyam  Bantock  With Catherine Wyn-Rogers, mezzo-soprano, Toby Spence, tenor, BBC Symphony Chorus, BBC Symphony Orchestra  cond. Vernon Handley  2005/2007  Chandos  CHSA 5051(3)

Vespers  Mozart  Requiem  Fauré   The Sixteen & Academy of St Martin in the Fields  cond. Harry Christophers   2007  Coro  CORI6057

In terra pax/ A spotless rose  Finzi/Howells  With City of London Choir, Bournemouth Symphony Orchestra con. Hilary Davan Wetton  2009  Vaxos  8.572102

Pageant of Empire/Sea Pictures Elgar, Lights Out Gurney Shore Leave Hurd  BBC Concert Orchewstra cond. Martin Yates  2009  Epoch  CDLX 7243

Sea Drift/Cynara  Delius  Hallé Orchestra, Choir and Youth Choir  cond. Sir Mark Elder  2011/12  CD HLL 7535

Ring Dance of the Nazarene/The Moth Requiem  Birtwistle  BBC Singers, The Nash Ensemble cond. Nicholas Kok  2013  Signum Classoc  SIGCD368

Falling Nan/Movie House/Songs of Innocence  Kenneth Fuchs  London Symphony Orchestra cond JoAnn Falletta  2013  Naxos 8.559753

Aftertones/No Man's Land  Colin Matthews  Hallé Choir and Orchestra  cond. Nicholas Collon  2014  CD HLL 7538

Requiem da Camera  Finzi  London Mozart Players  cond. Hilary Davan Wetton   2014  Naxos  8.573426

Israel in Egypt  Handel  Nederlands Kamerkoor Le Concert Lorrain cond. Roy Goodman 2014 ET'CETERA

Three Nocturnes  Vaughan Williams   BBC Symphony Orchestra  cond. Martyn Brabbins   2015  Albion Records

Israel in Agypten  Handel/Mendelssohn  With Choir of the King's Consort, The King's Consort, cond. Robert King  2015  VIVAT 111

Fantasia on Christmas Carols  Vaughan Williams  With the Choir of Magdalen College Oxford, cond. Daniel Hyde  2016  Opus Arte  OA CD9022

Songs  Elgar  BBC Philharmonic Orchestra cond. Sir Andrew Davis  2017  Chandos  CHSA 5188

Choral Symphony  Dyson  Bach Choir, Bournmouth Symphony Orchestra dir. David Hill  2017  Naxos  8.573770

Four Last Songs  Vaughan Williams  Bergen Philharmonic Orchestra cond Sir Andrew Davis  2017  Chandos CHSA 5186

Dream Song  Daniel Kidane  Chineke! Orchestra and Chorus  cond. Anthony Parnther  2018  NMC Recordings NMC D250

L'Enfance du Christ  Berlioz  Melbourne Symphony Orchestra and Chorus  cond. Sir Andrew Davis  2018  Chandos  CHSA 5228(2)

Songs of Travel  Vaughan Williams  Royal Scottish National Orchestra  cond. Martin Yates  2018  Dutton Epoch  CDLX 7359

Messiah  Handel  Rias Kammerchor Berlin  Akademie für Alte Musik Berlin cond. Justin Doyle  2020   PENTATONEOpera'''

Ned Keene: Peter Grimes  Britten  City of London Sinfonia  cond. Richard Hickox  1995  Chandos CHAN 94477/8

Obstinate, Watchful, First Shepherd:  The Pilgrim's Progress  Vaughan Williams  Chorus and Orchestra of the Royal House  cond. Richard Hickox  1997  Chandos  CH 9625(2)

Prince Andrey Bolkonsky: War and Peace  Prokofiev  Spoleto Festival Orchestra  cond. Richard Hickox 1999  Chandos  9855

Gallanthus: The Poisoned Kiss  Vaughan Williams  BBC National Orchestra of Wales cond. Richard Hickox  2003  Chandos  CHAN 10120(2)

Rôle uncredited: A Hand of Bridge  Barber  Royal Scottish National Orchestra cond. Marin Alsop  2003  Naxos 8.559135

Head Reaper: Ruth  Lennox Berkeley  City of London Sinfonia  cond. Richard Hickox  2003  Chandos  CHAN 10301

The Earl of Dunmow: A Dinner Engagement  Lennox Berkeley  City of London Sinfonia  cond. Richard Hickox  2003  Chandos  CHAN 10219

Mercury:  The Judgment of Paris  Eccles  Early Opera Company cond. Christian Curnyn  2008  Chandos CHAN 0759

Wandering Jew: The Wandering Jew  Saxton  BBC Symphony Orchestra, BBC Singers cond André de Ridder  2008/09  NMC Recordings  NMC D170

Harlequin  Ariadne on Naxos  Richard Strauss  Scottish Chamber Orchestra  cond Sir Richard Armstrong  2010  Chandos  CHAN 3168(2)

Captain Balstrode:  Peter Grimes  Britten  Bergen Philharmonic Orchestra and Choirs  cond.  Edward Gardner  2019  Chandos  CHSA 5250(2)

Composition
Williams was commissioned by the Financial Times in 2014 to compose a Christmas carol, 'Christmas Bells', a setting of a poem by Longfellow. It was premiered by the Godwine Choir at St George the Martyr church in Southwark, London. His choral orchestral setting of Keats' To Autumn'' was commissioned by the Waynflete Singers in 2019 and was premiered in Winchester Cathedral on 16 October 2021.

References

External links
 Groves Artists agency page on Roderick Williams
 Allmusic Guide page on Roderick Williams
 Signum Records biography of Roderick Williams
 Roderick Williams, "'Oh, the glamour!' – Roderick Williams weighs up a singer's life".  The Arts Desk, 6 July 2017

1965 births
Living people
English operatic baritones
English people of Jamaican descent
Singers from London
Officers of the Order of the British Empire
20th-century British  male opera singers
20th-century Black British male singers
21st-century British  male opera singers
21st-century Black British male singers
20th-century British composers
21st-century British composers
British male composers